Pandurang Barora  is an Indian politician and member of the Shiv Sena. He was elected to Maharashtra Legislative Assembly in 2014 from the Shahapur Vidhan Sabha constituency in Thane district.

Positions held
 2014: Elected to Maharashtra Legislative Assembly

References

External links
  Shivsena Home Page 

People from Thane district
Shiv Sena politicians
Members of the Maharashtra Legislative Assembly
Living people
Marathi politicians
Year of birth missing (living people)
Nationalist Congress Party politicians